Richard J. Burdge (December 28, 1833 –8 May 1916)  was a member of the Wisconsin State Assembly and the Wisconsin State Senate.

Background 
Burdge was born on December 28, 1833, in Axbridge, England. Later, he resided in Beloit, Wisconsin.

Political career 
Burdge was a member of the Assembly during the 1879 and 1880 sessions. Later, he was a member of the Senate during the 1891 and 1893 sessions, representing the 17th District. Other positions Burdge held include member of the School Board and Mayor of Beloit. He was a Republican.

References

External links
The Political Graveyard

1833 births
1916 deaths
English emigrants to the United States
19th-century English people
Republican Party members of the Wisconsin State Assembly
Politicians from Beloit, Wisconsin
People from Axbridge
Republican Party Wisconsin state senators
Mayors of places in Wisconsin
School board members in Wisconsin